Gilbert Ray Hodges (né Hodge; April 4, 1924 – April 2, 1972) was an American first baseman and manager in Major League Baseball (MLB) who played most of his 18-year career for the Brooklyn / Los Angeles Dodgers. He was widely regarded as the major leagues' outstanding first baseman in the 1950s, with teammate Duke Snider being the only player to have more home runs or runs batted in during the decade. Hodges held the National League (NL) record for career home runs by a right-handed hitter from 1960 to 1963, with his final total of 370 briefly ranking tenth in major league history; he held the NL record for career grand slams from 1957 to 1974. An eight-time All-Star, he anchored the infield on six pennant winners, and remains one of the most beloved and admired players in team history.

A sterling defensive player, Hodges won the first three Gold Glove Awards and led the NL in double plays four times and in putouts, assists and fielding percentage three times each. He ranked second in NL history with 1,281 assists and 1,614 double plays when his career ended, and was among the league's career leaders in games (6th, 1,908) and total chances (10th, 16,751) at first base. He managed the New York Mets to the 1969 World Series title, one of the greatest upsets in sports history, before his death from a sudden heart attack at age 47.

Early years
Hodges was born in Princeton, Indiana, the son of coal miner Charles and his wife Irene (nee Horstmeyer). He had an older brother, Robert, and a younger sister, Marjorie. The family moved to nearby Petersburg when Hodges was seven. He was a star four-sport athlete at Petersburg High School, earning a combined seven varsity letters in football, baseball, basketball and track. Hodges declined a  contract offer from the Detroit Tigers, instead attending Saint Joseph's College with the hope of eventually becoming a collegiate coach. Hodges spent two years (1941–1942 and 1942–1943) at St Joseph's, competing in baseball, basketball and briefly in football.

He was signed by his agent, Gabriel Levi, of the Brooklyn Dodgers in 1943, and appeared in one game for the team as a third baseman that year. Hodges entered the United States Marine Corps during World War II after having participated in its Reserve Officers' Training Corps program at Saint Joseph's. He served in combat as an anti-aircraft gunner in the 16th Anti-Aircraft Artillery Battalion, participating in the battles of Tinian and Okinawa, and received a Bronze Star Medal with Combat "V" for heroism under fire.

Following the war, Hodges also spent time completing course work at Oakland City University, near his hometown, playing basketball for the Mighty Oaks, joining the 1947–48 team after four games (1–3 record); they finished at 9–10. One of his teammates, Bob Lochmueller, would go on to star at the University of Louisville and play in the NBA.

Brooklyn/Los Angeles Dodgers
Hodges was discharged from the Marine Corps in 1946, and returned to the Dodgers organization as a catcher with the Newport News Dodgers of the Piedmont League, batting .278 in 129 games as they won the league championship; his teammates included first baseman and future film and television star Chuck Connors.

Hodges was called up to Brooklyn in 1947, the same year that Jackie Robinson broke baseball's color barrier. He played as a catcher, joining the team's nucleus of Robinson, Pee Wee Reese and Carl Furillo. With the emergence of Roy Campanella behind the plate, manager Leo Durocher shifted Hodges to first base. Hodges' only appearance in the 1947 World Series against the New York Yankees was as a pinch hitter for pitcher Rex Barney in Game Seven, but he struck out.

On June 25, Hodges hit for the cycle on his way to his first of seven consecutive All-Star teams. For the season, his 115 runs batted in ranked fourth in the NL, and he tied Hack Wilson's  club record for right-handed hitters with 23 home runs. Defensively, he led the NL in putouts (1,336), double plays (142) and fielding average (.995). Facing the Yankees again in the  Series, he batted only .235 but drove in the sole run in Brooklyn's only victory, a 1–0 triumph in Game 
Two. In game five, he hit a two out, three-run homer in the seventh to pull the Dodgers within 10–6, but struck out to end the game and the Series.

On August 31,  against the Boston Braves, Hodges joined Lou Gehrig as only the second player since 1900 to hit four home runs in a game without the benefit of extra innings; he hit them against four different pitchers, with the first coming off Warren Spahn. He also had seventeen total bases in the game, tied for third in MLB history.

That year he also led the league in fielding (.994) and set an NL record with 159 double plays, breaking Frank McCormick's mark of 153 with the  Cincinnati Reds; he broke his own record in 1951 with 171, a record which stood until Donn Clendenon had 182 for the 1966 Pittsburgh Pirates. He finished 1950 third in the league in both homers (32) and runs batted in (113), and came in eighth in the Most Valuable Player voting. In 1951 he became the first member of the Dodgers to ever hit 40 home runs, breaking Babe Herman's 1930 mark of 35; Campanella hit 41 in 1953, but Hodges recaptured the record with 42 in 1954 before Snider eclipsed him again with 43 in 1956. His last home run of 1951 came on October 2 against the New York Giants, as the Dodgers tied the three-game NL playoff series at a game each with a 10–0 win; New York won the pennant the next day on Bobby Thomson's "Shot Heard 'Round the World". Hodges also led the NL with 126 assists in 1951, and was second in home runs, third in runs (118) and total bases (307), fifth in slugging percentage (.527), and sixth in runs batted in (103).

Hodges was an eight-time All-Star, from 1949 to 1955 and in 1957. With his last home run of 1952, he tied Dolph Camilli's Dodger career record of 139, surpassing him in 1953; Snider moved ahead of Hodges in 1956. He again led the NL with 116 assists in the 1952 campaign and was third in the league in home runs (32) and fourth in runs batted in (102) and slugging (.500).

A great fan favorite in Brooklyn, Hodges was perhaps the only Dodgers regular never booed at their home park Ebbets Field. Fans were supportive even when Hodges suffered through one of the most famous slumps in baseball history: after going hitless in his last four regular-season games of 1952, he also went hitless in all seven games of the 1952 World Series against the Yankees (finishing the Series 0-for-21 at the plate), with Brooklyn losing to the Yankees in the seven games. When Hodges' slump continued into the following spring, fans reacted with countless letters and good-luck gifts, and one Brooklyn priest – Father Herbert Redmond of St. Francis Roman Catholic Church – told his flock: "It's far too hot for a homily. Keep the Commandments and say a prayer for Gil Hodges." Hodges began hitting again soon afterward, and rarely struggled again in the World Series.  Teammate Carl Erskine, who described himself as a good Baptist, kidded him by saying, "Gil, you just about made a believer out of me."

Hodges was involved in a blown call in the 1952 World Series. Johnny Sain was batting for the Yankees in the 10th inning of Game 5 and grounded out, as ruled by first base umpire Art Passarella. The photograph of the play, however, shows Sain stepping on first base while Hodges, also with a foot on the bag, is reaching for the ball that is about a foot shy of entering his glove. Baseball commissioner Ford Frick, an ex-newspaperman himself, refused to defend Passarella.

Hodges ended 1953 with a .302 batting average, finishing fifth in the NL in runs batted in (122) and sixth in home runs (31). Against the Yankees in the 1953 Series, Hodges hit .364; he had three hits, including a homer in the 9–5 Game 1 loss, but the Dodgers again lost in six games. Under their new manager Walter Alston in 1954, Hodges set the team home run record with 42, hitting a career-high .304 and again leading the NL in putouts (1,381) and assists (132). He also set a still-standing record with 19 sacrifice flies. He was second in the league to Ted Kluszewski in home runs and runs batted in (130), fifth in total bases (335), and sixth in slugging (.579) and runs (106), and placed tenth in the Most Valuable Player vote.

The Boys of Summer
In the 1955 season, Hodges' regular-season production declined to a .289 average, 27 home runs and 102 runs batted in. Facing the Yankees in the World Series for the fifth time, he was 1-for-12 in the first three games before coming around. In Game 4, Hodges hit a two-run homer in the fourth inning to put Brooklyn ahead, 4–3, and later had a single that drove in a run as they held off the Yankees, 8–5; he also scored the first run in the Dodgers' 5–3 win in Game 5. In Game 7, he drove in Campanella with two out in the fourth inning for a 1–0 lead and added a sacrifice fly to score Reese with one out in the sixth inning. Johnny Podres scattered eight New York hits, and when Reese threw Elston Howard's grounder to Hodges for the final out, Brooklyn had a 2–0 win and their first World Series title in franchise history and their only championship in Brooklyn.

In 1956, Hodges had 32 home runs and 87 runs batted in as Brooklyn won the pennant again, and once more met the Yankees in the World Series. In the third inning of Game 1, he hit a three-run homer to put Brooklyn ahead, 5–2, as they went on to a 6–3 win; he had three hits and four runs batted in during the 13–8 slugfest in Game 2, scoring to give the Dodgers a 7–6 lead in the third and doubling in two runs each in the fourth and fifth innings for an 11–7 lead. In Don Larsen's perfect game Hodges struck out, flied to center, and lined to third base, as Brooklyn went on to lose in seven games.

In 1957 Hodges set the NL record for career grand slams, breaking the mark of 12 shared by Rogers Hornsby and Ralph Kiner; his final total of 14 was tied by Hank Aaron and Willie McCovey in 1972, and broken by Aaron in 1974. He finished seventh in the NL with a .299 batting average and fifth with 98 runs batted in, and leading the league with 1,317 putouts. He was also among the NL's top ten players in home runs (27), hits (173), runs (94), triples (7), slugging (.511) and total bases (296); in late September, he drove in the last Dodgers run ever at Ebbets Field, and the last run in Brooklyn history. Hodges was named to his last All-Star team and placed seventh in the Most Valuable Player balloting, the highest position in his career.

After the Dodgers relocated to Los Angeles, on April 23, 1958, Hodges became the seventh player to hit 300 home runs in the NL, connecting off Dick Drott of the Chicago Cubs. That year he also tied a post-1900 record by leading the league in double plays (134) for the fourth time, equaling Frank McCormick and Ted Kluszewski; Donn Clendenon eventually broke the record in 1968. Hodges' totals were 22 home runs and 64 runs batted in as the Dodgers finished in seventh place in their first season in California. He also broke Dolph Camilli's NL record of 923 career strikeouts in 1958.

In 1959, the Dodgers captured another NL title, with Hodges contributing 25 home runs, 80 runs batted in, and a batting average of .276, coming in seventh in the league with a .513 slugging mark; he also led the NL with a .992 fielding average. He batted .391 in the 1959 World Series against the Chicago White Sox (his first against a team other than the Yankees), with his solo home run in the eighth inning of Game 4 giving the Dodgers a 5–4 win, as they triumphed in six games for another Series championship.

In 1960, Hodges broke Kiner's NL record for right-handed hitters of 351 career home runs, and appeared on the TV program Home Run Derby. In his last season with the Dodgers in 1961, he became the team's career runs batted in leader with 1,254, passing Zack Wheat; Snider moved ahead of him the following year. Hodges received the first three Rawlings Gold Glove Awards, from 1957 to 1959.

Return to New York
After being chosen in the 1961 MLB Expansion Draft, Hodges was one of the original 1962 Mets and despite knee problems was persuaded to continue his playing career in New York, hitting the first home run in franchise history. By the end of the year, in which he played only 54 games, he ranked tenth in MLB history with 370 home runs – second to only Jimmie Foxx among right-handed hitters. He also held the National League (NL) record for career home runs by a right-handed hitter from 1960 to 1963, and held the NL record for career grand slams from 1957 to 1974.

Managerial career

After 11 games with the Mets in 1963, during which he batted .227 with no homers and was plagued by injuries, he was traded to the Washington Senators in late May for outfielder Jimmy Piersall so that he could replace Mickey Vernon as Washington's manager. Hodges immediately announced his retirement from playing in order to focus on his new position. The Giants' Willie Mays had passed him weeks earlier on April 19 to become the NL's home run leader among right-handed hitters; Hodges' last game had been on May 5 in a doubleheader hosting the Giants (who had moved to San Francisco in 1958). Hodges managed the Senators through 1967, and although they improved in each season they never achieved a winning record.

In 1968 Hodges was brought back to New York to manage the perennially woeful Mets, and while the team only posted a 73–89 record it was nonetheless the best mark in their seven years of existence up to that point.

In the second game of doubleheader on July 30, 1969, the Houston Astros, after scoring 11 runs in the ninth inning of the first game, were in the midst of a 10-run third inning, hitting a number of line drives to left field. When the Mets' star left fielder Cleon Jones failed to hustle after a ball hit to the outfield, Hodges removed him from the game, but rather than simply signal from the dugout for Jones to come out, or delegate the job to one of his coaches, Hodges left the dugout and slowly, deliberately, walked all the way out to left field to remove Jones, and walked him back to the dugout, which was a resounding message to the whole team. Jones reportedly never again had to be reminded to hustle.

That year, Hodges led the "Miracle Mets" to the World Series championship, defeating the heavily favored Baltimore Orioles; after losing Game 1, the team came back for four straight victories, including two by 2–1 scores. Finishing higher than ninth place for the first time, the Mets became not only the first expansion team to win a World Series, but also the first team ever to win the Fall Classic after finishing at least 15 games under .500 the previous year. Hodges was named The Sporting News Manager of the Year, in skillfully platooning his players, utilizing everyone in the dugout, keeping everyone fresh.  Hodges continued as manager through the 1971 season.  He died before the opening of the 1972 season and was succeeded by Yogi Berra.

Death and impact
On the afternoon of April 2, 1972, Easter Sunday, Hodges was in West Palm Beach, Florida completing a round of golf with Mets coaches Joe Pignatano, Rube Walker, and Eddie Yost, when he collapsed en route to his motel room at the Ramada Inn across the street from Municipal Stadium, then the spring training facility of the Atlanta Braves and Montreal Expos. Hodges had suffered a sudden heart attack and was rushed to Good Samaritan Hospital where he died within 20 minutes of arrival. Pignatano later recalled Hodges falling backwards and hitting his head on the sidewalk with a "sickening knock", bleeding profusely and turning blue. Pignatano said "I put my hand under Gil's head, but before you knew it, the blood stopped. I knew he was dead. He died in my arms." A lifelong chain smoker, Hodges had suffered a minor heart attack in 1968, during a game in late September.

Jackie Robinson, himself ill with heart disease and diabetes, told the Associated Press, "He was the core of the Brooklyn Dodgers. With this, and what's happened to Campy (Roy Campanella) and lot of other guys we played with, it scares you. I've been somewhat shocked by it all. I have tremendous feelings for Gil's family and kids." Robinson died of a heart attack six months later on October 24 at age 53.

Duke Snider said "Gil was a great player, but an even greater man." "I'm sick," said Johnny Podres, "I've never known a finer man." A crushed Carl Erskine said "Gil's death is like a bolt out of the blue." Don Drysdale, who himself died in Montreal of a sudden heart attack in 1993 at age 56, wrote in his autobiography that Hodges' death "absolutely shattered me. I just flew apart. I didn't leave my apartment in Texas for three days. I didn't want to see anybody. I couldn't get myself to go to the funeral. It was like I'd lost a part of my family."

The wake was held at Torregrossa Funeral Home, on Flatbush Ave in Brooklyn. The funeral was held at Our Lady Help of Christians Church in Midwood, Brooklyn, on April 4, what would have been Hodges' 48th birthday. Approximately 10,000 mourners attended the service.

Television broadcaster Howard Cosell was one of the many attendees at the wake. According to Gil Hodges Jr., Cosell brought him into the back seat of a car, where Jackie Robinson had been crying hysterically. Robinson then held Hodges Jr. and said, "Next to my son's death, this is the worst day of my life."

Hodges was survived by his wife, the former Joan Lombardi (b. 1926 in Brooklyn d. 2022), whom he had married on December 26, 1948, and their children Gil Jr. (b. 1950), Irene, Cynthia and Barbara. He is buried at Holy Cross Cemetery in East Flatbush, Brooklyn.

Yogi Berra succeeded him as manager, having been promoted from first base coach on the day of the funeral. The American flag flew at half-staff on Opening Day at Shea Stadium, while the Mets wore black armbands on their left arms during the entire 1972 season in honor of Hodges. On June 9, 1973, the Mets again honored Hodges by retiring his uniform number 14. 49 years later, the Dodgers, his longtime team, honored Hodges by retiring his uniform number 14 on June 4, 2022.

Accomplishments
Hodges batted .273 in his career with a .487 slugging percentage, 1,921 hits, 1,274 runs batted in, 1,105 runs, 370 home runs, 295 doubles and 63 stolen bases in 2,071 games. His 361 home runs with the Dodgers remain second in team history to Snider's 389. His 1,614 career double plays placed him behind only Charlie Grimm (1733) in NL history, and were a major league record for a right-handed fielding first baseman until Chris Chambliss surpassed him in 1984. His 1,281 career assists ranked second in league history to Fred Tenney's 1,363, and trailed only Ed Konetchy's 1,292 among all right-handed first basemen. Snider broke his NL record of 1,137 career strikeouts in 1964. When he retired after the 1963 season, he had hit the most home runs (370) ever by a right-handed batter up to that point in time (surpassed by Willie Mays) and the most career grand slams (14) by a National League player (eclipsed by Willie McCovey). He shares the major league record of having hit four home runs in a single game (only 18 players have ever done so in MLB history).

Legacy

Hodges received New York City's highest civilian honor, the Bronze Medallion, in 1969. On April 4, 1978 (what would have been Hodges' 54th birthday), the Marine Parkway Bridge, connecting Marine Park, Brooklyn with Rockaway, Queens, was renamed the Marine Parkway–Gil Hodges Memorial Bridge in his memory. Other Brooklyn locations named for him are a park on Carroll Street, a Little League field on Shell Road in Brooklyn, a section of Avenue L and P.S. 193. In addition, part of Bedford Avenue in Midwood, Brooklyn, is named Gil Hodges Way. A bowling alley in Mill Basin, Brooklyn, was formerly named Gil Hodges Lanes in his honor.

In Indiana, the high school baseball stadium in his birthplace of Princeton and a bridge spanning the East Fork of the White River in northern Pike County on State Road 57 bear his name. In addition, a Petersburg Little League baseball team is named in his honor, the Hodges Dodgers. In 2009, a  mural was dedicated in Petersburg featuring pictures of Hodges as a Brooklyn Dodger, as manager of the New York Mets, and batting at Ebbets Field.

Hodges became an inaugural member of the Indiana Baseball Hall of Fame in 1979. He was inducted into the New York Mets Hall of Fame in 1982. In 2007, Hodges was inducted into the Marine Corps Sports Hall of Fame. In 2021, he was inducted in the New York State Sports Hall of Fame.

In 2000, Hodges was featured in the documentary Gil Hodges: The Quiet Man, based on the book of the same name by author Marino Amoruso. In November 2021, a 30-minute documentary—The Gil Hodges Story: Soul Of A Champion—was released and features interviews with Vin Scully, Tommy Lasorda, Carl Erskine, Gil Hodges Jr., and members of the 1969 New York Mets.

Hall of Fame consideration

Background
For decades, there was controversy over Hodges not being selected for induction to the Baseball Hall of Fame. He was considered to be one of the finest players of the 1950s, and graduated to managerial success with the Mets. However, critics of his candidacy pointed out that despite his offensive prowess, he never led the National League in any offensive category such as home runs, runs batted in, or slugging percentage, and never came close to winning a Most Valuable Player award. Additionally, until the election of Tony Pérez in 2000, every first baseman in the Hall had either 500 career home runs or a batting average over .295; at the time of Hodges' death, the BBWAA had only elected two position players (Rabbit Maranville and Roy Campanella) with batting averages below .285. Hodges' not having been voted an MVP may have resulted in part from his having had some of his best seasons (1950, 1954 and 1957) in years when the Dodgers did not win the pennant.

BBWAA candidate
After last playing in the major leagues during the 1963 season, Hodges first appeared on the 1969 ballot, receiving 24.1% of ballots cast by BBWAA electors, with 75% the threshold for election. He was considered annually through the 1983 ballot, his 15th and final ballot appearance under BBWAA rules at the time. He appeared on 63.4% of ballots in 1983 voting, the highest percentage of his candidacy. Hodges collected 3,010 votes cast by the BBWAA from 1969 to 1983, the most votes for an unselected player until surpassed by Jim Rice in 2008, prior to Rice's election the following year.

Veterans Committee candidate
Hodges was considered for selection by the Hall of Fame's Veterans Committee starting in 1987. Voting by the committee was held in closed sessions for many years, but results are known for Hodges in  voting (61%),  (65%),  (61%), and  (43.8%). Each time, Hodges fell short of the 75% minimum required for election.

Golden Era / Golden Days candidate
In 2011, Hodges became a Golden Era candidate (1947–1972 era) for consideration to be elected to the Hall of Fame by the Golden Era Committee, which replaced the Veterans Committee in 2010. In December 2011, voting by the committee took place during the Hall of Fame's two-day winter meeting in Dallas, Texas. Induction to the Hall requires at least 12 votes (75%) from the 16-member committee. Of 10 candidates, Ron Santo was the only one elected, having received 15 votes; Jim Kaat had 10 votes, and Hodges and Minnie Miñoso were tied with nine votes.

Hodges' next opportunity under the Golden Era Committee was in December 2014, when the committee voted at the MLB winter meeting. Hodges received only three votes, and none of the other eight player candidates on the ballot were elected to the Hall of Fame, including Dick Allen and Tony Oliva, who each fell one vote shy of the 12-vote threshold. In July 2016, the Golden Era committee was succeeded by the Golden Days committee (1950–1969 era).

Hodges was one of 10 nominees named on November 5, 2021 to the Golden Days Era ballot for Hall of Fame consideration. On December 5, the Hall of Fame announced Hodges' election, having received 12 of 16 votes to meet the 75% threshold. Hodges was formally inducted on July 24, 2022, with his daughter Irene delivering a speech on his behalf.

See also

List of lifetime home run leaders through history
List of Major League Baseball career home run leaders
List of Gold Glove Award winners at first base
Lou Gehrig Memorial Award
List of Major League Baseball retired numbers
List of Major League Baseball career runs scored leaders
List of Major League Baseball career runs batted in leaders
List of Major League Baseball players to hit for the cycle
List of Major League Baseball single-game home run leaders

References

Further reading
https://www.amazon.com/Gil-Hodges-Hall-Fame-Life/dp/1496206029/ref=sr_1_1?crid=1DT6NPJ93092J&keywords=gil+Hodges+a+hall+of+fame+life+paperback&qid=1659036717&s=digital-text&sprefix=gil+hodges+a+hall+of+fame+life+paperback%2Cdigital-text%2C75&sr=1-1https://www.amazon.com/Gil-Hodges-Hall-Fame-Life/dp/1496206029/ref=sr_1_1?crid=1DT6NPJ93092J&keywords=gil+Hodges+a+hall+of+fame+life+paperback&qid=1659036717&s=digital-text&sprefix=gil+hodges+a+hall+of+fame+life+paperback%2Cdigital-text%2C75&sr=1-1https://www.amazon.com/Gil-Hodges-Hall-Fame-Life/dp/1496206029/ref=sr_1_1?crid=1DT6NPJ93092J&keywords=gil+Hodges+a+hall+of+fame+life+paperback&qid=1659036717&s=digital-text&sprefix=gil+hodges+a+hall+of+fame+life+paperback%2Cdigital-text%2C75&sr=1-1===Books===

Articles

External links

Gil Hodges at the Baseball Hall of Fame

1924 births
1972 deaths
Major League Baseball first basemen
Brooklyn Dodgers players
Los Angeles Dodgers players
New York Mets players
National Baseball Hall of Fame inductees
National League All-Stars
Gold Glove Award winners
Major League Baseball players with retired numbers
Baseball players from Indiana
Newport News Dodgers players
New York Mets managers
Washington Senators (1961–1971) managers
World Series-winning managers
Major League Baseball managers with retired numbers
United States Marine Corps personnel of World War II
United States Marines
Saint Joseph's Pumas baseball players
Saint Joseph's Pumas football players
Saint Joseph's Pumas men's basketball players
Sportspeople from Brooklyn
Baseball players from New York City
People from Princeton, Indiana
People from Petersburg, Indiana
People from Midwood, Brooklyn
Burials at Holy Cross Cemetery, Brooklyn